Barrie Transit is a Canadian public transport agency serving the city of Barrie.  Daily operation of Specialized Transit (formally known as BACTS) is provided under contract by MVT Canadian Bus.

Hubs

Barrie Bus Terminal

Other hubs

Georgian College 
Platform 1: 100A B, C, D, Red/blue Express., 8A RVH/Yonge - Southbound, 8B Crosstown/Essa - Southbound
Platform 2: 6A Letitia, 6B College

Park Place 
Platform 1: 1A Georgian Mall - Northbound, 
Platform 2: 2A Dunlop - Northbound, 7A Grove - Northbound
Platform 3: 8A RVH/Yonge - Northbound, 3A Bayview - Northbound
Platform 4: 8B Crosstown/Essa - Northbound
Bayview Drive / North Village Way: 3B Painswick - Southbound

Allandale GO  
Platform 2: 7A/7B
Platform 3: 8A SB/8B NB
Platform 4: 4A/4B
Platform 10: 1A/8A NB (Via stop on Essa Road)
Essa Road at Allandale GO 1B/ 8B SB)

Barrie South GO 
Platform 6: 3A/8A SB
Platform 7: 4A
Platform 8: 8B NB

See also

 Public transport in Canada

References

External links

 Barrie Transit
 Drawings and photos of Barrie Transit buses

Transit agencies in Ontario
Transport in Barrie
1972 establishments in Ontario